Joan Sella i Montserrat (Sitges, 1960) is a Catalan journalist, writer and gastronomy critic. He worked at Televisión Española. In 2002, he published Breviari del xató with El Pati Blau, a publishing house from Sitges. Comer como un rey, published in 2009, shows the menus and banquets of Amadeus I, Count of Savoy and Alfonso XII of Spain. In 2010, he published El misteri de "La nena de la clavellina" (Edicions Saldonar), where, named as a Santiago Rusiñol painting, he seeks to recover his memories of childhood and adolescence in Sitges, his hometown.

Published work 
 Breviari del xató, El Pati Blau, 2002
 Comer como un rey, Trea, 2009, 
 El misteri de "La nena de la clavellina", Saldonar, 2010,

References 

Journalists from Catalonia
Sitges
Food writers from Catalonia
1960 births
Living people